In philosophy, truth by consensus  is the process of taking statements to be true because people generally agree upon them.

Imre Lakatos characterizes it as a "watered down" form of provable truth propounded by some sociologists of knowledge, particularly Thomas Kuhn and Michael Polanyi.

Philosopher Nigel Warburton argues that the truth by consensus process is not a reliable way of discovering truth, that there is general agreement upon something does not make it actually true.
There are two main reasons for this:

 One reason Warburton discusses is that people are prone to wishful thinking.  People can believe an assertion and espouse it as truth in the face of overwhelming evidence and facts to the contrary, simply because they wish that things were so.  
 The other one is that people are gullible, and easily misled.

See also

 Common knowledge
 Consensus reality
 Conventional wisdom
 Cultural impact of The Colbert Report § Wikipedia references
 Jury trial
 
 Truthiness

References 

Consensus
Consensus reality
Concepts in epistemology
Informal fallacies
Philosophy of science
Truth